"The Conversation" is a song recorded by American singer-songwriters and musicians Waylon Jennings and Hank Williams Jr. Originally, the song was included on Williams Jr.'s 1979 album Whiskey Bent and Hell Bound. The track was later reissued on Jennings' 1983 album Waylon and Company, which consisted almost entirely of duets, and was released as the album's second radio single. A music video was made to promote the single, a rarity for country music at the time. It was the first for Jennings and the second for Williams, with his first being "Queen of My Heart".  The song was a moderately successful hit and reached number 15 on the Billboard Hot Country Singles & Tracks chart.

Content
The song recounts a conversation in which Jennings inquires about Williams's parents, Hank Williams Sr. and Audrey Williams.

Chart performance

References

1979 songs
1983 singles
Waylon Jennings songs
Hank Williams Jr. songs
Male vocal duets
Songs written by Waylon Jennings
Songs written by Hank Williams Jr.
RCA Records singles
Songs about Hank Williams